Cali & El Dandee are a Colombian Latin Pop Music urban duo, consisting of brothers Alejandro Rengifo (Cali) and Mauricio Rengifo (Dandee). They started their career in 2008 and have been together since. Besides singing, Dandee is also active as a producer. He co-produced Luis Fonsi's major hit "Despacito".

Their biggest hits are "Gol", "Volver","Move Your Body","Tus Ojos", "Lento", "La Muda". Their most successful singles "Por Fin Te Encontré" and "Yo Te Esperaré" have received more than 800 million and 370 million views respectively on YouTube. Their debut album 3 A.M. was released on July 10, 2012, on record company Universal Music Spain.

In 2012, Cali & El Dandee collaborated with Spanish singer David Bisbal in the Spanish official anthem for Euro 2012, "No hay 2 sin 3".

Award and records
The group have received several nominations in the Premios Nuestra Tierra.

On July 11, 2011 the group received a Double Platinum certification by PROMUSICAE for sales of 80,000 copies of their single "Yo Te Esperaré" in Spain. The song, which is about love, includes lyrics such as "even though my life's over, I'll wait for you" and "we'll walk along the sea". At the same time, their second single "No Hay 2 Sin 3 (Gol)", featuring David Bisbal, achieved Gold with sales over 20,000 copies. "Yo Te Esperaré" and "No Hay 2 Sin 3 (Gol)" were the second and the tenth best selling singles of 2012 in Spain.

Discography

Studio albums

Singles

As lead artist

As featured artist 
 2015: "Pon el alma en el juego" (with Dulce María, D-Niss, Luciano Pereyra y Sam Alves)
 2016: "Mil tormentas" (Morat feat. Cali y el Dandee)
 2016: "Traicionera" (Sebastian Yatra, Cosculluela)
 2017: "Loca" (Maite Perroni feat. Cali y el Dandee)
 2017: "Tu me obligaste" (Antonio José feat. Cali y el Dandee)
 2018: "Como si nada" (Sebastian Yatra, Cali)
 2018: "Te voy amar" (Andres Cepeda feat. Cali y el Dandee)
 2021: "Mañana" (Álvaro Soler feat. Cali y el Dandee)

Awards and nominations

Premios 40 Principales
Premios 40 Principales is an awards ceremony hosted annually by the Spanish radio channel Los 40 Principales.

|-
| rowspan="1" align="center"|2011
| Cali & El Dandee
| Best Colombian Act
|
|-
| rowspan="6" align="center"|2012
| "No Hay 2 Sin 3 (Gol)" (with David Bisbal)
| rowspan="2"|Best Latin Song
| 
|-
| rowspan="2"|Yo Te Esperaré
|
|-
| Best America Song
|
|-
| rowspan="3"|Cali & El Dandee
| Best Latin Artist
|
|-
| Best America Urban Act
| 
|-
| Best America Best South Act
| 
|-
| 2013
| Cali & El Dandee
| Best Latin Artist
| 
|-

World Music Awards
The World Music Awards is an international awards show founded in 1989 that annually honors recording artists based on worldwide sales figures provided by the International Federation of the Phonographic Industry (IFPI).

|-
| rowspan="3" align="center"|2013
| rowspan="2"| No Digas Nada (Dejá Vu)
| World's Best Song
|
|-
| World's Best Video
|
|-
| Cali & El Dandee
| World's  Best Group
|
|-

MTV Europe Music Awards
The MTV Europe Music Awards were established in 1994 by MTV Networks Europe to celebrate the most popular music videos in Europe.

|-
| 2013
| Cali & El Dandee
| Best Latin America Central Act
|
|-

Premios Nuestra Tierra
A Premio Nuestra Tierra is an accolade that recognize outstanding achievement in the Colombian music industry. Cali & El Dandee has received four nominations.

|-
| style="text-align:center;" rowspan="4"|2014 || "No Digas Nada" || Best Song of the Year || 
|-
| "No Digas Nada" || Best Pop Performance of the Year || 
|-
| Themselves || Best Pop Solo Artist or Group || 
|-
|  "No Digas Nada" || Best Music Video ||

References

21st-century Colombian male singers
Sibling musical duos
Universal Music Latin Entertainment artists